Ban Dong is a subdistrict in the Chat Trakan District of Phitsanulok Province, Thailand.

Geography
Ban Dong lies in the Nan Basin, which is part of the Chao Phraya Watershed.

Administration
The following is a list of the subdistrict's muban, which roughly correspond to the villages:

Temples
The following is a list of active Buddhist temples in Ban Dong:
วัดบ้านดง in Ban Dong 
วัดนาหล่ม in Ban Na Lom
วัดนาตาจูม in Ban Nathajum
วัดซำหวาย in Ban Non Phayom
วัดห้วยน้ำอุ่น in Ban Huai Nam Un
วัดพรสวรรค์วราราม in Ban Huai Thin Thok

References

Tambon of Phitsanulok province
Populated places in Phitsanulok province